Rugby union in Algeria is a minor but growing sport. After many years of work, in 2015, Algeria finally created a federation enabling them to apply for member status of Rugby Africa (the administrative body for rugby union within Africa).

History
Rugby union was introduced into Algeria by the French. Some Pied-Noirs (ethnic European Algerians) would go on to become significant rugby players, such as Maurice Boyau.

As with many minor rugby nations, rugby is centered on Oran, Guelma, Algiers, Annaba.

Like many North African countries, the historical connection with France is a mixed blessing. For a number of years, Algerian rugby players would leave to play there, which deprived Algerian rugby of any real competition. There are at least sixty Algerians playing in English and French rugby. Like many other Maghrebi nations, Algerian rugby tended to look to Europe for inspiration, rather than to the rest of Africa.

However, one exception might be Boumedienne Allam: Allam first played for France U-21 squad, winning the Six Nations Tournament of that category, in 2000. He was a member of the historical first game of Algeria national rugby union team, on  24 February 2007.

After independence, the first club created was Stade Oranais in Oran on 2007. Algerian federation was created on 2015 and the first championship started on 2018.

Clubs
Algeria has six rugby union clubs to date, and there are plans to set up a proper national club competition. They are currently trying to promote the game in universities and schools.

 Stade Oranais (Oran)
 Rugby Club d'Alger (Algiers)
 Mouloudia M'sila (M'sila)
 Rugby Club de Béjaïa (Bejaia)
 Rugby Turck (Aïn El Turk - Oran)
 Etoile de Biskra (Biskra)

For the 2017–18 season, these were the top teams:

National teams

Men's teams
Algeria national rugby union team

The national rugby union team played its first unofficial game on 24 February 2007 under its first coach Morad Kellal. Almost all players play at French clubs, however there are some national players who practice the sport in Australia, New Zealand, Romania and England.

On 18 December 2015, the national team played its first official game since the creation of the Algerian rugby federation (FAR) against the Tunisian rugby union team, to which they won 16 - 6. This was also the first international match played on Algerian soil (Oran), which was televised on the Algerian channel Canal Algerie in the country for the first time.

Ahmed Zabana Stadium which is situated in Oran is the official venue of Algeria national team.

Algeria national sevens union team

Women's teams
Algeria women's national rugby union team
Algeria women's national rugby sevens team

Competitions

Men's competitions
Algerian rugby union Championship
Algerian rugby sevens Championship

Women's competitions
Algerian women's rugby union Championship
Algerian women's rugby sevens Championship

Youth competitions
Competitions for men's and women's rugby union for U-10, U-12, U-14, U-16, U-18 and U-20.

References

External links
 Algeria Rugby
 "Islam and Rugby" on the Rugby Readers review
  Rugby In Algeria
 
  Algerian rugby team statistics
 Current Situation